Susan Holmes (born October 8, 1942) is an American politician, farmer, former teacher, and former postmaster from Georgia. Holmes is a Republican member of the Georgia House of Representatives from the 129th District.

Early life 
Holmes was born in Jasper County, Georgia. Holmes graduated from Monticello High School.

Education 
Holmes earned a Bachelor of Science degree in Business Education from University of Georgia.

Career 
Holmes is a cotton and dairy farmer in Jasper County, Georgia. Holmes is a former teacher and postmaster.

In 1998, Holmes became the first woman mayor of Monticello, Georgia, until 2010.

In January 2007, Holmes was appointed by President George W. Bush as the State Executive Director of the Farm Service Agency for Georgia.

On November 2, 2010, Holmes won the election and became a Republican member of Georgia House of Representatives for District 125. Holmes defeated David Gault with 64.74% of the votes.

On November 6, 2012, Holmes won the election unopposed and became a Republican member of Georgia House of Representatives for District 129. On November 4, 2014, as an incumbent, Holmes won the election unopposed and continued serving District 129. On November 8, 2016, as an incumbent, Holmes won the election unopposed and continued serving District 129. On November 6, 2018, as an incumbent, Holmes won the election unopposed and continued serving District 129. On November 3, 2020, as an incumbent, Holmes won the election and continued serving District 129. Holmes defeated Sharonda Bell and Joe Reed with 69.61% of the votes.

Awards 
 2001 Citizen of The Year. Presented by Monticello-Jasper County Chamber of Commerce.

Personal life 
Holmes' husband is Paul Holmes. They have three children. Holmes and her family live in Monticello, Georgia. Holmes was a controversial Georgia False Elector. Georgia False Electors were recruited by the Georgia Republican Party to support Donald Trump's failed effort to subvert the results of the 2020 presidential election.

References

External links 
 Susan Holmes at house.ga.gov
 Susan Holmes at ballotpedia.org
 Susan Holmes at ourcampaigns.com

1942 births
21st-century American politicians
21st-century American women politicians
Farmers from Georgia (U.S. state)
Georgia (U.S. state) postmasters
Educators from Georgia (U.S. state)
Living people
Republican Party members of the Georgia House of Representatives
People from Jasper County, Georgia
People from Monticello, Georgia
Women state legislators in Georgia (U.S. state)
Schoolteachers from Georgia (U.S. state)
20th-century American women educators
20th-century American educators